Synodontis velifer is a species of upside-down catfish native to Burkina Faso, Ivory Coast and Ghana where it can be found in the Pra River and the Sassandra, Bandama and Volta basins.  This species grows to a length of  TL.

References

External links 

velifer
Freshwater fish of West Africa
Taxa named by John Roxborough Norman
Fish described in 1935